Ihosy FC is a Malagasy football club based in Ihosy in the Ihorombe Region in central south Madagascar.

The team plays in THB Champions League.

Stadium
Currently the team plays at the 5000 capacity Stade Maître Kira.

League participations
THB Champions League: 2011-
Madagascar Second Division:

References

External links

Ihosy